Monica Waldvogel (born February 9, 1956, in São Paulo) is a Brazilian journalist.

She graduated in Journalism in 1977. She was editor-in-chief and news presenter of Jornal da Globo and Jornal Hoje. Since 2008, she presented Entre Aspas.

Awards
Mulher IMPRENSA trophy.

References

1956 births
Living people
Brazilian journalists
Brazilian women journalists
Brazilian women television presenters
Brazilian television presenters